Gabriel "Gabe" Reid (born May 28, 1977) is a former American football tight end for the Chicago Bears in the National Football League.  He was signed as an undrafted free agent out of BYU.

Football career
Reid played high school football for Leone High School in Leone, American Samoa and followed older brother Spencer Reid to Brigham Young University. Spencer was the first graduate from an American Samoan high school to play in the NFL, playing for the Carolina Panthers (1998) and Indianapolis Colts (1999). 

After not being selected in the 2003 NFL Draft, Reid signed with the Chicago Bears. Late in the 2006 season, Bears head coach Lovie Smith converted Reid into a fullback after starter Jason McKie injured his ankle. He fumbled a kickoff return in Super Bowl XLI at his 35-yard line with Colts player Tyjuan Hagler recovering and the Colts, after a fumble of their own, subsequently scored. Reid became a restricted free agent after the season, but was not offered an extension and did not return to the Bears.

He ended his four-year NFL career with seven receptions for 57 yards and no touchdowns.

Personal
Reid is a husband and a father of four children, three girls and one boy. He is a member of the Church of Jesus Christ of Latter-day Saints (LDS Church).

References

1977 births
Living people
American football tight ends
BYU Cougars football players
Chicago Bears players
Players of American football from American Samoa
American Samoan Latter Day Saints
People from Pago Pago
American sportspeople of Samoan descent